Jan-Michael Gambill and Andy Roddick were the defending champions but did not compete that year.

Martin Damm and Cyril Suk won in the final 6–3, 6–7(5–7), [10–5] against David Adams and Ben Ellwood.

Seeds

  Mahesh Bhupathi /  Leander Paes (first round)
  Martin Damm /  Cyril Suk (champions)
  Simon Aspelin /  Andrew Kratzmann (quarterfinals)
  Michaël Llodra /  Thomas Shimada (semifinals)

Draw

External links
 2002 Delray Beach International Tennis Championships Doubles draw

2002
2002 ATP Tour
2002 Delray Beach International Tennis Championships